Beast of Blood may refer to:

Beast of Blood (film), a 1970 Filipino horror film
"Beast of Blood" (maxi single), a 2001 release by Malice Mizer

See also
Blood of the Beasts, a 1949 French documentary
Blood of the Beast, a 2003 American film
Blood Beast (2007), the fifth book in Darren Shan's The Demonata series